Orlin Woodrow Rogers (November 5, 1912 – February 20, 1999), nicknamed "Buck" or "Lefty", was a Major League Baseball pitcher who played for the Washington Senators in . He attended college at Virginia where he was a member of Phi Sigma Kappa fraternity.

References

External links

1912 births
1999 deaths
Major League Baseball pitchers
Baseball players from Virginia
Washington Senators (1901–1960) players
People from Pittsylvania County, Virginia
Harrisburg Senators players
York White Roses players
Trenton Senators players
Albany Senators players
Wilkes-Barre Barons (baseball) players
Portsmouth Cubs players
Spartanburg Spartans players
South Boston Wrappers players
Brockville Pirates player